Paul Leary Walthall (born May 7, 1957), known as Paul Leary, is an American musician and music producer from Austin, Texas, best known as the lead guitarist and occasional lead vocalist for the American rock band Butthole Surfers. He is also the producer of a number of songs and albums by other bands, including U2, Sublime, Meat Puppets, Daniel Johnston, The Reverend Horton Heat, Pepper, Maggie Walters, Bad Livers, Slightly Stoopid, and The Refreshments. Leary produced Sublime with Rome's debut album, Yours Truly.

In 1991, Leary released a solo album entitled The History of Dogs. In 1994, he appeared on the song "Lounge Fly" from the multi-platinum album Purple by Stone Temple Pilots. He also performed backing vocals on the Meat Puppets and Bad Livers respective renditions of his song "Pee Pee the Sailor". Leary appeared on one track on the 1999 John Paul Jones (ex-Led Zeppelin) solo album Zooma. He formed a new band called The Cocky Bitches (formerly Carny) and in 2014 contributed three songs to the Melvins album Hold It In.

Leary released Born Stupid, his second solo album, on February 12, 2021 via Shimmy-Disc and Joyful Noise.

References

External links
 U2.com News
 Buttholesurfers.org

Record producers from Texas
American rock guitarists
American male guitarists
Butthole Surfers members
Hardcore punk musicians
Noise rock musicians
Living people
Musicians from San Antonio
Trinity University (Texas) alumni
1957 births
Rough Trade Records artists
Guitarists from Texas
20th-century American guitarists